Sergey Betov and Alexander Bury were the defending champions, but Bury decided not to participate. Betov teamed up with Michail Elgin and successfully defended the title, beating Denys Molchanov and Franko Škugor in the final, 6–3, 7–5.

Seeds 

  Sergey Betov /  Michail Elgin (champions)
  Radu Albot /  Alexander Kudryavtsev (quarterfinals)
  Chen Ti /  Jeevan Nedunchezhiyan (quarterfinals)
  Denys Molchanov /  Franko Škugor (final)

Draw

Draw

References 
 Main Draw

Fergana Challenger - Men's Doubles
2015 Men's Doubles